Coleothrix obscuriella is a species of snout moth in the genus Coleothrix. It was described by Inoue in 1959. It is found in China (Hainan), Taiwan and Japan.

References

Moths described in 1959
Phycitinae
Moths of Japan